Rye High School is a public high school in unincorporated Pueblo County, Colorado, United States, near Rye. It is a part of the Pueblo County School District.

As of 2015, the school reported 222 students. The school fields teams in baseball, basketball, cross country, football, golf, soccer, track, volleyball, and wrestling.

References

External links

Public high schools in Colorado
Schools in Pueblo County, Colorado